Smiths Bench is a distinctive bench-like elevation 5 nautical miles (9 km) northwest of Mount Baldwin, in the Freyberg Mountains. Named by Advisory Committee on Antarctic Names (US-ACAN) for William M. Smith, psychologist, a member of the United States Antarctic Research Program (USARP) Victoria Land Traverse Party which surveyed this area in 1959–60.

Terraces of Antarctica
Landforms of Victoria Land
Pennell Coast